The Yankauer suction tip (pronounced yang´kow-er) is an oral suctioning tool used in medical procedures. It is typically a firm plastic suction tip with a large opening surrounded by a bulbous head and is designed to allow effective suction without damaging surrounding tissue. This tool is used to suction oropharyngeal secretions in order to prevent aspiration. A Yankauer can also be used to clear operative sites during surgical procedures and its suctioned volume counted as blood loss during surgery.

Developed around 1907 by American otolaryngologist Sidney Yankauer (1872–1932), the Yankauer suction instrument has become the most common medical suction instrument in the world.

See also
Instruments used in general surgery

References

Medical equipment